4-Track Guitar Music  is the sixth overall and first internet EP by John Frusciante, released on November 24, 2015 onto his Bandcamp and his Soundcloud . 4-Track Guitar Music was also released the same day and year as Renoise Tracks 2009-2011, his first internet album since 2001's From the Sounds Inside.

Recording
4-Track Guitar Music was recorded in May 2010. It is an instrumental EP, with a similar sound to his first solo album, Niandra LaDes and Usually Just a T-Shirt. The recording of the EP took place while Frusciante was taking a full electronic direction of his music, saying this possibly with the release of his fifth EP, Letur-Lefr, and stating this definitely with his ninth studio album, PBX Funicular Intaglio Zone, and later albums and projects.

Frusciante said, at the release of the EP on his Soundcloud, 4-Track Guitar Music was "recorded on a 4-track cassette in May 2010, the instrumentation being 3 guitars and one drum machine. It is a bunch of weird anti-rock star guitar solos, played mainly on a Mosrite Ventures guitar, and a Yamaha SG, accompanied by an Elektron Machinedrum, excepting one song where I used a Roland TR 707, and another where a 707 was used, but is not in the mix."

Track listing

Personnel

Musician
John Frusciante – all instruments, engineering, mixing, mastering, producing

Artwork
Aura T-09 – cover art, design

References 

2015 albums
John Frusciante albums